"Slowly Slowly" is a song by Indian singer-songwriter Guru Randhawa featuring American rapper Pitbull, released on 19 April 2019 via T-Series.

Background 
The song is a collaboration between Guru Randhawa and Pitbull, and is released under the T-Series label. It is Guru Randhawa's first international collaboration. The lyrics, written by Guru Randhawa and Pitbull themselves, are in Punjabi, English, and Spanish. It has been described as the "party anthem of the year" by T-Series. It became popular not only due to the presence of international audience but also the fact that it was released during the time T-Series was gaining subscribers at a faster rate and going to become the most subscribed channel on YouTube.

Credits and personnel 
 Guru Randhawa – vocals, songwriting
 Pitbull – vocals, songwriting
 DJ Shadow – music
 DJ BlackOut – music, mixing
 DJ Money Willz – music
 Vee Music – music
 MKSHFT – music
 Al Burna – mixing
 David Fuller – mastering

Reception 

The song marked Guru Randhawa and label T-Series' international debut. It was well received by audiences. The song's music video was watched about 38 million times on YouTube India in its first 24 hours and the only one on the list not accompanied by an album release. The video was watched 100 million times on YouTube in less than 14 days.

As of June 2022, it has over 250 million views on YouTube.

References 

2019 singles
Bhangra (music) songs
Indian pop
Indian songs
T-Series (company) singles
Pitbull (rapper) songs
Guru Randhawa songs
Punjabi-language songs
Spanish-language songs
Macaronic songs
Songs written by Pitbull (rapper)
Songs written by DJ Shadow